Chick Evans (1890–1915) was an American amateur golfer.

Chick Evans may also refer to:
 Chick Evans (baseball) (1889–1916), Major League pitcher (born Charles Franklin Evans)
 Chick Evans (coach) (1901–1976), Northern Illinois University football and basketball coach
 Charles Evans Jr. (born 1963), American  film producer

See also
 Charles Evans (disambiguation)